Sangeang Api (Gunung Api or Gunung Sangeang) is an active complex volcano on the island of Sangeang in Indonesia. It consists of two volcanic cones,  Doro Api and  Doro Mantoi. Sangeang Api is one of the most active volcanoes in the Lesser Sunda Islands. It erupted in 1988 and the island's inhabitants were evacuated. Between its first recorded eruption in 1512 and 1989 it erupted 17 times. It erupted again during December 2012 and May 2014.

The island of Sangeang is part of the Lesser Sunda Islands. It is located northeast of Sumbawa in the Flores Sea, and is 13 km wide with an area of 153 km2.

The earliest document mentioning about the Sang Hyang Api volcano was found in 14th century Majapahit script of Nagarakretagama.
"Gunung Api" also appears as the name for the mountain in the first chapter of the novel The Long Journey by Johannes V. Jensen.

2014 Eruption

Since mid-June 2013, authorities had put the volcano on 'high alert' for a possible eruption. On May 30, 2014, a major eruption occurred at around 3:55 p.m. local time. Farmers working on the island were evacuated. Ash and smoke quickly rose to an altitude 15–20 km (≈10–16 miles) into the sky. By the next morning, the ash cloud had crossed the north-west coast of Australia in the Kimberley region, and airlines had cancelled flights into and from Darwin, Northern Territory. It later went as far as Alice Springs in the Northern Territory. On 31 May some flights from Melbourne and Adelaide to Bali were also cancelled.

Climate
Sangeang Api has a subtropical highland climate (Cfb). It has moderate rainfall from June to September and heavy to extremely heavy rainfall in the remaining months.

References

External links
 NASA Space Shuttle images:
 STS112-E-5628 Directly from above volcano.
   STS61A-40-62

Volcanoes of the Lesser Sunda Islands
Complex volcanoes
Mountains of Indonesia
Active volcanoes of Indonesia
Lesser Sunda Islands
21st-century volcanic events